Jan Stanisław Parys (born 1950) was the Minister of National Defence for Poland from 1991 to 1992. He was the President of the Jagiellonian College, and is currently a Board Member at the Polish Institute of International Affairs. He holds a doctorate in sociology from the University of Warsaw.

References

Further reading

Interview with Jan Parys

1950 births
Living people
Ministers of National Defence of Poland
University of Warsaw alumni
Centre Agreement politicians